Sama District is one of ten districts of the province Tacna in Peru.

Authorities

Mayors 
 2011-2014: Milton John Juarez Vera. 
 2007-2010: Wilson Bertolotto Ticona.

References